Hollins may refer to:

Places

United States
 Hollins, Alabama, a census-designated place and unincorporated community
 Hollins, Virginia, a census-designated place
 Hollins, Roanoke, Virginia, a neighborhood of Roanoke
 Hollins Island, New York

England
 Hollins, Bolton, Greater Manchester
 Hollins, Bury, Greater Manchester
 Hollins, Cumbria
 Hollins, Derbyshire
 Hollins, Oldham, Greater Manchester, an area of Oldham
 Hollins, Rochdale, Greater Manchester
 Hollins, Kidsgrove, Staffordshire, a suburb
 Hollins Brook, Greater Manchester, a watercourse

People and fictional characters
 Hollins (surname), a list of people and fictional characters

Schools
 Hollins University, Virginia, United States, a private university
 The Hollins, Lancashire, England, a secondary school

Other uses
 Hollins baronets, an extinct title in the Baronetage of the United Kingdom